Walla Walla County is a county located in the U.S. state of Washington. As of the 2020 census, its population was 62,584. The county seat and largest city is Walla Walla. The county was formed on April 25, 1854 and is named after the Walla Walla tribe of Native Americans.

Walla Walla County is included in the Walla Walla, WA Metropolitan Statistical Area. The Walla Walla MSA is the third smallest metropolitan area in the United States, after the Carson City, Nevada MSA and Enid, OK MSA.

Geography

Geographic features
Columbia River
Snake River
Blue Mountains
Touchet River
Ponderosa Pines
Banana Belt
Walla Walla River

Major highways
 U.S. Route 12

Adjacent counties
Columbia County - east
Umatilla County, Oregon - south
Benton County - west
Franklin County - northwest

National protected areas
 McNary National Wildlife Refuge
 Umatilla National Forest (part)
 Whitman Mission National Historic Site

Demographics

2000 census
As of the census of 2000, there were 55,180 people, 19,647 households, and 13,242 families living in the county.  The population density was 43 people per square mile (17/km2).  There were 21,147 housing units at an average density of 17 per square mile (6/km2).  The racial makeup of the county was 85.3% White, 1.7% Black or African American, 0.8% Native American, 1.1% Asian, 0.2% Pacific Islander, 8.2% from other races, and 2.6% from two or more races.  15.7% of the population were Hispanic or Latino of any race. 20.1% were of German, 10.7% English, 7.7% United States or American and 7.3% Irish ancestry.

There were 19,647 households, out of which 32.10% had children under the age of 18 living with them, 54.00% were married couples living together, 9.50% had a female householder with no husband present, and 32.60% were non-families. 27.10% of all households were made up of individuals, and 12.40% had someone living alone who was 65 years of age or older.  The average household size was 2.54 and the average family size was 3.08.

In the county, the population was spread out, with 24.60% under the age of 18, 13.40% from 18 to 24, 26.50% from 25 to 44, 20.80% from 45 to 64, and 14.80% who were 65 years of age or older.  The median age was 35 years. For every 100 females there were 103.80 males.  For every 100 females age 18 and over, there were 102.90 males.

The median income for a household in the county was $35,900, and the median income for a family was $44,962. Males had a median income of $34,691 versus $24,736 for females. The per capita income for the county was $16,509.  About 10.20% of families and 15.10% of the population were below the poverty line, including 18.80% of those under age 18 and 8.20% of those age 65 or over.

2010 census
As of the 2010 census, there were 58,781 people, 21,719 households, and 14,132 families living in the county. The racial makeup of the county was 84.5% white, 1.8% black or African American, 1.3% Asian, 1.0% American Indian, 0.3% Pacific islander, 8.0% from other races, and 3.1% from two or more races. Those of Hispanic or Latino origin made up 19.7% of the population. In terms of ancestry, 23.5% were German, 13.3% were English, 12.7% were Irish, and 6.6% were American.

Of the 21,719 households, 30.8% had children under the age of 18 living with them, 50.1% were married couples living together, 10.5% had a female householder with no husband present, 34.9% were non-families, and 28.2% of all households were made up of individuals. The average household size was 2.50 and the average family size was 3.05. The median age was 36.7 years.

The median income for a household in the county was $45,575 and the median income for a family was $55,773. Males had a median income of $42,704 versus $35,586 for females. The per capita income for the county was $23,027. About 12.4% of families and 17.5% of the population were below the poverty line, including 24.6% of those under age 18 and 9.2% of those age 65 or over.

Communities

Cities
College Place
Prescott
Waitsburg
Walla Walla (county seat)

Census-designated places
Burbank
Dixie
Garrett
Touchet
Walla Walla East
Wallula

Unincorporated communities
Ayer
Burbank Heights
Lowden
Calhounville

Politics

Walla Walla County is generally Republican; it has voted for that party in all but one presidential election since 1940, and has voted Democratic just five times since Washington's statehood in 1889. Like the state as a whole, third-party candidates often receive a larger share of the vote than they do nationally. The county is part of Washington's 5th congressional district, which is represented by Republican Cathy McMorris Rodgers.

Education
School districts in Walla Walla County include:
 College Place School District
 Columbia School District
 Dixie School District
 Prescott School District
 Touchet School District
 Waitsburg School District
 Walla Walla Public Schools

See also
National Register of Historic Places listings in Walla Walla County, Washington

Footnotes

Further reading
 Frank T. Gilbert, Historic Sketches: Walla Walla, Columbia and Garfield Counties, Washington Territory. Portland, OR: A.G. Walling Printing House, 1882.
 W.D. Lyman, Lyman's History of Old Walla Walla County, Embracing Walla Walla, Columbia, Garfield and Asotin Counties. In Two Volumes. Chicago: S.J. Clarke Publishing Co., 1918. Volume 1 | Volume 2
 Frederic Ambrose Shaver, An Illustrated History of Southeastern Washington, Including Walla Walla, Columbia, Garfield and Asotin Counties, Washington. Spokane, WA: Western Historical Publishing Co., 1906.

External links
Walla Walla Washington at HistoryLink.org
Walla Walla photographs collection at the Whitman College and Northwest Archives, Whitman College.

 
1854 establishments in Washington Territory
Eastern Washington
Washington placenames of Native American origin